Strychnos elaeocarpa is a species of plant in the Loganiaceae family. It is endemic to Cameroon.  Its natural habitat is subtropical or tropical moist lowland forests. It is threatened by habitat loss.

References

Flora of Cameroon
elaeocarpa
Vulnerable plants
Taxonomy articles created by Polbot